"Follow You" is a song by British rock band Bring Me the Horizon. Produced by keyboardist Jordan Fish and vocalist Oliver Sykes, it was featured on the band's 2015 fifth studio album That's the Spirit. The song was also released as the fifth single from the album on 26 February 2016, reaching number 95 on the UK Singles Chart and topping the UK Rock & Metal Singles Chart.

Promotion and release
"Follow You" was first revealed in a short teaser trailer, alongside another for That's the Spirit opening track "Doomed", on 28 August 2015. Alternative Press writer Tom Bryant described it as "an emotional ballad littered with skittering electronics". Andy Biddulph of Rock Sound described it as "a love song – or the closest thing to it that this band has ever written", and as a "cross between PVRIS and Linkin Park". In a pre-release review of the album, Gigwise's Amy Gravelle noted that "Follow You" sees Sykes "pour[ing] out his heart in an emotional epilogue". It is categorized as a pop rock song with hip hop influenced beats by Emmy Mack of Music Feeds. On 26 February 2016, the track was released as a single in the form of a limited edition 7" vinyl.

Composition and lyrics
Bring Me the Horizon vocalist Oliver Sykes and keyboardist Jordan Fish originally started writing "Follow You" at around the same time as they wrote "Drown", which was released as a single in 2014. According to Sykes, the song's lyrics were based on his relationship with his wife during "a particular rough patch, when things weren't looking too good"; during a track-by-track commentary of the album for Spotify, he explained that the overarching message was that "no matter how bad being together can sometimes get, the alternative is just so much worse".

Music video
The music video for "Follow You" was premiered on 16 March 2016 via the band's Vevo channel. Co-directed by Bring Me the Horizon frontman Oliver Sykes and Frank Borin, the video depicts a series of violent events described by a number of commentators as leading to the end of the world, including seemingly random acts of violence, murder, arson and property damage, as a young man listens to the song, dances and sings in the street, oblivious to the events around him. Loudwire's Joe DiVita proposed that while the video was "brutally graphic" and "NSFW", this served as "the perfect juxtaposition" to the "somber and emotional song" to which it was the visual accompaniment. Alternative Press writer Caitlyn Ralph merely described it as "intriguing".

The video was noted by many critics for its graphic nature. Rock Sound writer Andy Biddulph, for example, described the video as "horrifying", noting that it contained "gore, death, guns and violence against animals". Similarly, James Hingle of Kerrang! warned that it was "not for the faint-hearted". Of particular contention was a scene in which a Golden Retriever is shot and killed by a mail carrier. Fuse's Zach Dionne reacted to the video simply with the phrase "What the fuck", before berating it as "an immense misstep" by the band. Emmy Mack of Music Feeds displayed shock at the video, describing it as "a gruesome, NSFW fucking bloodbath", although did praise the production by noting that "The whole thing is a god damn motherfucking horror movie. But at least it's a blockbuster one." Bring Me the Horizon later responded to the controversy on Twitter, joking about the dog's fate.

Critical reception
Critical response to "Follow You" was generally positive. Bradley Zorgdrager of Exclaim! praised the song for "reigning in the force while remaining impactful", in contrast to much of the rest of the album which he criticised for sounding too similar to bands such as Thirty Seconds to Mars and Linkin Park. MTV's Mike Pell described the song as "One of the tamer, more anthemic singles" from That's the Spirit. Reviewing the album for DIY magazine, Sarah Jamieson identified "Follow You" as one of the album's tracks which sees Bring Me the Horizon "stepping further out of their comfort zone than ever before", describing it as "atmospheric".

Commercial performance
"Follow You" entered the UK Rock & Metal Singles Chart at number six on 18 September 2015, following the release of That's the Spirit, when it also registered on the main UK Singles Chart for a solitary week at number 95. After moving up and down the top ten for a number of months, it later topped the UK Rock & Metal Singles Chart on 25 March 2016, replacing A Day to Remember's "Paranoia". In the United States, the track reached number 34 on the Billboard Hot Rock Songs chart.

Track listing

Personnel
Credits adapted from Tidal.

Bring Me the Horizon
 Oliver Sykes – lead vocals, production, composition, programming
 Lee Malia – guitars, composition
 Matt Kean – bass, composition
 Matt Nicholls – drums, composition
 Jordan Fish – keyboards, synthesizers, programming, percussion, backing vocals, production, composition, engineering

Additional musicians
 Maddie Cutter – cello
 Will Harvey – violin

Additional personnel
 Al Groves – engineering
 Sam Winfield – engineering
 Nikos Goudinakis – assistant engineering
 Ted Jensen – mastering
 Dan Lancaster – mixing

Charts

Certifications

References

External links
 "Follow You" music video at YouTube

2015 songs
2016 singles
Bring Me the Horizon songs
British pop rock songs
Rock ballads
Songs written by Oliver Sykes
Sony Music singles